Tradescantia hirsuticaulis, commonly called hairystem spiderwort, is a species of plant in the dayflower family that is native to south-central United States.

It is a perennial that produces purple or blue flowers in the spring on herbaceous stems.

References

Tradescantia
Flora of the Southeastern United States
Flora without expected TNC conservation status